Fivepointville is an unincorporated community and census-designated place (CDP) in Brecknock Township, Lancaster County, Pennsylvania, United States. As of the 2010 census the population was 1,156. The town is named for its position at an intersection of five separate roads.

Geography
Fivepointville is in northeastern Lancaster County, in the southwest part of Brecknock Township. It is bordered to the south by Muddy Creek, which is also the border with East Earl Township. The five roads meeting at the center of town are Dry Tavern Road (north and south), Fivepointville Road (west), West Maple Grove Road (northeast), and Pleasant Valley Road (east-southeast). Pennsylvania Route 897 follows Dry Tavern Road, leading north  to Swartzville and south  to Terre Hill.

The community is in the Muddy Creek watershed, which flows west to the Conestoga River and eventually the Susquehanna.

The main offices of Weaver's Store Inc. are located in Fivepointville. Since 1959, Greenview Bible Camp has operated a youth summer camp program here.

Demographics

References

Unincorporated communities in Lancaster County, Pennsylvania
Census-designated places in Lancaster County, Pennsylvania